Léopold Durand OSB (1666–1746) was a French architect.

Bibliography 

Dom Durand was born in Saint-Mihiel (Lorraine) in 1666. He studied law and architecture, after which he went te become a member of the order of Saint Benedict (1702).

Works 

 Traité historique des eaux et baines de Plombières (1748)
 Recueil sur l’architecture
 Plans de diverses églises
 Description des temples de Chine
 Termes de l’art et architecture militaires
 De la construction des voûtes
 Jeux et combats des Grecs
 Recueil sur les théatres des Anciens

1666 births
1746 deaths
People from Lorraine
French Benedictines
17th-century French architects
18th-century French architects